Cerithiopsis bilineata is a species of sea snail, a gastropod in the family Cerithiopsidae. It was described by Hoernes, in 1848.

References

bilineata
Gastropods described in 1848